Andrea Purner-Koschier (2 August 1972) is an Austrian former cyclist. She won the Austrian National Road Race Championships in 1992, 2000 and 2001.

References

External links
 

1972 births
Living people
Austrian female cyclists
Sportspeople from Tyrol (state)
20th-century Austrian women
21st-century Austrian women